François-Xavier-Ovide Méthot (September 19, 1843 – October 19, 1908) was a Quebec farmer and political figure. He represented Nicolet in the Legislative Assembly of Quebec from 1871 to 1876 and in the House of Commons of Canada as an Independent Conservative member from 1877 to 1884.

He was born in Quebec City in 1843, the son of François-Xavier Méthot, and studied at the Séminaire de Québec. He married his cousin Clara, the daughter of Antoine-Prosper Méthot, in 1864. Méthot was a farmer at Saint-Pierre-les-Becquets and served as mayor there from 1868 to 1872. In 1871, he was elected to the legislative assembly of the province in Nicolet as a Conservative; he was reelected in 1875 but his election was declared invalid by the Quebec Superior Court in June 1876. He did not run again in the subsequent by-election but was elected to the federal parliament in an 1877 by-election after the then-sitting member was named to the Legislative Council of Quebec. Méthot represented Nicolet until 1884, when he was named to the Legislative Council of Quebec in De La Vallière district. He remarried in 1885; his second wife was Marie-Clara-Louise-Ernestine Paradis. He died in office at Saint-Pierre-les-Becquets in 1908.

References 
 
 

1843 births
1908 deaths
Conservative Party of Quebec MNAs
Members of the House of Commons of Canada from Quebec
Independent Conservative MPs in the Canadian House of Commons
Conservative Party of Quebec MLCs
Mayors of places in Quebec